Helmut Latz (born 12 March 1955) is a German rower. He competed in the men's eight event at the 1976 Summer Olympics.

References

1955 births
Living people
German male rowers
Olympic rowers of West Germany
Rowers at the 1976 Summer Olympics
Rowers from Cologne